The Nations! is a Canadian/New Zealand digital comedy/reality competition series starring Sean Cullen and Jarred Christmas. It premiered on CBC Punchline and Television New Zealand on 29 February 2016.

Plot 
The Nations is a comedic take on the travelogue, where two comedian hosts travel each of their respective nations, discussing which one is better on a variety of topics. Hosted by Sean Cullen (Canada) and Jarred Christmas (New Zealand), the series looks at strange facts and locations from each country, focusing on food, drinks, politics, etc. The interactive website that accompanies the digital series allows users to vote on the 'winner' of each episode, while also competing against other users by partaking in quizzes, games, and more, culminating in the final decision of which nation is the best. The winning nation has yet to be announced.

Guest appearances 
 Rob FordFormer Mayor of Toronto
 Don Newman Broadcast journalist
 Jacinda Ardern Labour Party MP
 Meghan AgostaHockey player, Canada women's national ice hockey team
 Noah CantorFormer football player, Canadian Football League
 Jill Barber - Musician
 Villainy - Band
 Kings - Musician
 Chris Locke - Comedian
 Allison Price - Comedian
 Cassie Moes - Comedian
 Pax Assadi - Comedian
 Dr. Jess O'Reilly - Sexologist

Episodes

References

External links 
 The Nations! official website
 The Nations! on CBC Punchline
 The Nations! on TVNZ

2010s Canadian comedy television series
2010s New Zealand television series
2016 Canadian television series debuts
2016 Canadian television series endings
2016 New Zealand television series debuts
2016 New Zealand television series endings
New Zealand comedy television series